The Canton of Golo-Morosaglia is an administrative division of the Haute-Corse department, Corsica, France. It was created at the French canton reorganisation which came into effect in March 2015. Its seat is in Morosaglia.

It consists of the following communes:
 
Aiti
Alando
Albertacce
Alzi
Asco
Bigorno
Bisinchi
Bustanico
Calacuccia
Cambia
Campile
Campitello
Canavaggia
Carticasi
Casamaccioli
Castellare-di-Mercurio
Castello-di-Rostino
Castifao
Castiglione
Castineta
Castirla
Corscia
Crocicchia
Erbajolo
Érone
Favalello
Focicchia
Gavignano
Lano
Lento
Lozzi
Mazzola
Moltifao
Monte
Morosaglia
Olmo
Omessa
Ortiporio
Penta-Acquatella
Piedigriggio
Pietralba
Popolasca
Prato-di-Giovellina
Prunelli-di-Casacconi
Rusio
Saliceto
San-Lorenzo
Santa-Lucia-di-Mercurio
Sant'Andréa-di-Bozio
Scolca
Sermano
Soveria
Tralonca
Valle-di-Rostino
Volpajola

References

Cantons of Haute-Corse